Rick Elwood DeMulling (born July 21, 1977) is a former American football guard who played in the National Football League. He was originally drafted by the Indianapolis Colts in the seventh round of the 2001 NFL Draft. He played college football at Idaho. DeMulling currently lives in Indiana, where he voluntarily coaches the offensive line for Brownsburg High School.

Early years
DeMulling attended Cheney High School from 1993 to 1996 (Cheney, Washington) where he won varsity letters in football, baseball, and basketball.

College career
DeMulling attended the University of Idaho from 1996 to 2001 and was a four-year starter and a three-time All-Big West first-team selection.

Professional career
He was drafted in the seventh round, 220th pick, in the 2001 NFL Draft by the Indianapolis Colts.  He was a regular starter during the 2002–2004 seasons, before signing for the Detroit Lions as a free agent in 2005. After 2 seasons with the Lions, he re-signed for the Colts on March 30, 2007. He was released prior to the start of the 2007 season by the Colts, and was signed as a free agent by the Washington Redskins on September 20, 2007. He was released on November 20. On December 13, 2007, he was re-signed by the Redskins after placing Randy Thomas on IR.  He was not re-signed after the season and therefore became a free agent. Now working as a Realtor for Keller Williams Realty Indy Metro West after a few years at F.C. Tucker Company.

References

External links
Indianapolis Colts bio
Washington Redskins bio

1977 births
Living people
People from Cheney, Washington
Players of American football from Washington (state)
American football offensive guards
Idaho Vandals football players
Indianapolis Colts players
Detroit Lions players
Washington Redskins players